Thedden is a hamlet in the large civil parish of Bentworth in Hampshire, England, about  south east of the centre of Bentworth village. Its nearest town is Alton, about 3.5 miles (5.1 km) east of Thedden.

The nearest railway station is Alton which is 3.5 miles (5 km) to the east.  Until 1932 it was the Bentworth and Lasham railway station on the Basingstoke and Alton Light Railway, until its closure in 1932.

Thedden Grange is a large country house, the area originally being part of the Bentworth Hall estate. During the Second World War it was used as a prisoner of war camp.

References

Villages in Hampshire